Haverhill is an unincorporated community in southern Green Township, Scioto County, Ohio, United States.  It has a post office with the ZIP code 45636.  An Ohio River town, it is located below Hanging Rock and above Franklin Furnace.

History
Haverhill was platted in 1848, and named after Haverhill, New Hampshire, the native home of a share of the early settlers. A post office called Haverhill has been in operation since 1852.

References

Unincorporated communities in Ohio
Unincorporated communities in Scioto County, Ohio
Ohio populated places on the Ohio River